The A 29 road is an A-Grade trunk road in Sri Lanka. It connects Horowapothana with Vavuniya.

The A 29 passes through Kebettigollawa and Madukanda to reach Vavuniya.

References

Highways in Sri Lanka
Transport in Vavuniya District